Dinesh D.C. (Nepali: दिनेश डिसी) is a Nepali film director, film producer, film actor, TV actor and presenter. His original name is Dinesh Raj Dahal. In 2019, he was awarded Prabal Janasewa Shree award for his contribution to Nepalese society by the president of Nepal. D.C. was included in the team from Nepali Film Industry along with Star Rajesh Hamal in 2018 Prime Minister KP Sharma Oli official state visit to India. He is currently working as Station Head of Kantipur Television Network and Station Manager of Radio Kantipur.

Personal life
Dinesh D.C. (Dahal Chhetri) was born in Illam of eastern Nepal on 17 November. He is married to Ranu Shrestha. He was schooled at Adarsha Ma. Vi., Ilam up to SLC. He did his intermediate (I.Sc) and bachelor (B.Sc) from Amrit Science Campus. He earned a B.A. in English as a private student. He earned an M.B.A from Saraswati Campus. His zodiac sign in scorpio.

Career
Dinesh D.C. entered in the Nepali Film Industry as an supporting artist on Sun Chandi (1997). He then played on different roles on films like Shankar (1997), Ek Number Ko Pakhe (1999) and Muna Madan (2003). He then made his own directorial debut from Savadhan (2006). His third directorial venture Maya's Bar earned him National Film Awards (Nepal) for Best Director and D-Cine Award for Critics Choice.  Dinesh D.C. was nominated in Kamana Film Award for Best Director from his next directorial venture, a comedy hit cha ekan cha. D.C.'s next directorial venture, a romantic drama Fulai Fulko Mausam Timilai (2016) was his first film as a producer.

Movie
2012 Maya's Bar 
2014 Chha Ekan Chha
 2016 Fulai Fulko Mausam Timilai (फूलैफूलको मौसम तिमीलाई ).

Television

Kasto Lagyo
Yastai Huncha
Dashain Ko Chyangra
Bihe Ko Kura
Doshi Ko?                               
Mamata                                            
Hijo Aaja Ko Kura                       
Kati Saphal Kati Asaphal                    
Chetana                                            
Umer 65                                 
Kathai                                               
Lakshya                                         
Biman Chalak                                                 
Raag Biragam                                                   
Ashmita                                                         
Bhumika

Documentary
Enchanting Pokhara
RNAC: An Introduction                                                   
An Introduction for Hotel Management College             
Mukti Bal Ashram

Anchor
He has worked in various national and international level entertainment programs and award shows as an anchor.

Awards
(dates in Bikram Sambat)
Geetanjali cine awards "best villain-2055" - film "sagun"
Kalliwood cine award "best new comer actor-2055" - film - "gham chhaya"
Kantipur outstanding performance award - 2056
Most popular personality award-2056
Best announcer of decade in stage -2062
Best debutant director –2064 saabadhan
Hari tara purashkar - 2069
Critics award - chhaya chhabi digital cinema awards - 2070 - film "maya's bar"
Most popular director of the year - box office award - 2070 - film "chha ekan chha"

References

External links
 

Nepalese film producers
Nepalese film directors
Living people
Date of birth missing (living people)
Year of birth missing (living people)
People from Ilam District
21st-century Nepalese film directors